The Belayan River is a river of Borneo, Indonesia, 1300 km northeast of the capital Jakarta. It is a tributary of the Mahakam River.

Hydrology 

The river traverses three districts in the upstream area of Kutai Kartanegara Regency, namely Kenohan, Kembang Janggut, and Tabang. The high flow rate during flooding constantly eroded the land on the river banks, causing damages to the houses built next to it. Belayan flows into the Mahakam River near Muhuran, Kotabangun, and Bukit Tinjawang.

Geography 

The river flows in the eastern area of Borneo island with predominantly tropical rainforest climate (designated as Af in the Köppen-Geiger climate classification). The annual average temperature in the area is 23 °C. The warmest month is March, when the average temperature is around 24 °C, and the coldest is January, at 22 °C. The average annual rainfall is 2780 mm. The wettest month is December, with an average of 351 mm rainfall, and the driest is August, with 138 mm rainfall.

Uses 
The Belayan River is vital for the population along its banks for transportation, water source for daily life, and also for occupation for some inhabitants, such as fish and gold. The river is important for the people of three districts, Kenohan, Kembang Janggut, and Tabang, even for centuries was the only access route to those three districts. At the upstream of Belayan there are some villages of Dayak Kenyak tribe, such as Ritan Baru, Tabang District, which can be reached about one or two days by boat or ferry from Samarinda. It took about two days and one night to travel from Tabang to Tenggarong using river transportation. The local Dayak tribe is known for wood sculptures and other handicrafts.

Along the river there are many ports to transport coals from the mines in Kutai Kartanegara for export.

Due to sedimentation, the Belayan River needs to be dredged regularly, so that it flows steadily to the downstream and doesn't cause much flooding.

Ecology 
The Belayan River is a habitat of Mahakam or Irrawaddy dolphin (Orcaella brevirostris), one of the river animals in the IUCN Red List of Threatened Species, and also of little egret (Egretta garzetta).

See also
List of rivers of Indonesia
List of rivers of Kalimantan

References

Further reading 
  Konsepsi pola penatagunaan hutan secara mikro, daerah aliran sungai Belayan, propinsi Dati I Kalimantan Timur. Banjarbaru, 1980.

Rivers of East Kalimantan
Rivers of Indonesia